Rhees may refer to:

 Benjamin Rush Rhees (1860–1939) president of the University of Rochester
 Rush Rhees (1905–1989) U.S. philosopher
 Rush Rhees Library, University of Rochester; named after Benjamin Rush Rhees

See also

 Rhys (surname)
 
 Rhee (disambiguation)
 Reece (disambiguation)
 Reese (disambiguation)
 Rees (disambiguation)
 Reis (disambiguation)